Inti is the Incan sun god. 
Inti may also refer to:

Technology and Science 
 INTI, Instituto Nacional de Tecnología Industrial (Argentina)
 Inti (insect), a wasp genus in the family Eulophidae
 Inti (plant), a plant genus in the subtribe Maxillariinae

Education 
 INTI International University, a group of universities in Southeast Asia

Organizations 
 Comunidad Inti Wara Yassi, a volunteer-supported non-governmental organization in Bolivia that maintains wildlife refuges
 Instituto Nacional de Tierras, Venezuelan government agency for land
 Inti Creates, a Japanese video game development company
 Inti Gas Deportes, a Peruvian football club located in Huamanga, Ayacucho
 Puka Inti, a small Maoist guerrilla organization in Ecuador

People 
 Inti Briones (born 1971), a Peruvian–Chilean cinematographer
 Inti Muñoz Santini (born 1974), a Mexican politician
 Inti Pestoni (born 1991), a Swiss ice hockey player who is currently playing for HC Ambrì-Piotta of National League A
 Inti Podestá (born 1978), a former Uruguayan football player, who played as a midfielder
 Inti (Jntj), daughter of pharaoh Teti of the Sixth Dynasty of Egypt
 Senedjemib Inti, a vizier from the Fifth dynasty of Egypt during the reign of king Djedkare Isesi
 Inti (drag queen), Spanish drag queen

Other 
 Inti Raymi, a religious ceremony of the Inca Empire in honor of the god Inti
 Inti Rumi, a mountain in the Bolivian Andes
 Inti-Illimani, an instrumental and vocal Latin American folk music ensemble from Chile.
 Peruvian inti, a former currency of Peru

See also 
 Intiguttu (disambiguation)

South American given names